Ospriocerus longulus is a species of robber flies (insects in the family Asilidae).

References

Further reading

External links

 

Asilidae
Insects described in 1866